The Zwaardvis-class submarine ("Swordfish") is a class of conventional attack submarines that were built to strengthen the Royal Netherlands Navy. The Dutch government opted for the choice to not replace the two Zwaardvis-class submarines with either more s, or submarines of a new design.

History
On 24 December 1965 the Royal Netherlands Navy gave Rotterdamsche Droogdok Maatschappij the order to build two submarines. At the time of this order the Royal Netherlands Navy believed that these two submarines could possibly make use of nuclear propulsion. Like many other navies around the world the Netherlands got interested in nuclear propulsion after the United States had put  into active service in 1955. The performance of this and succeeding nuclear submarine, such as the s, were very promising at the time. It made the Dutch navy believe that nuclear submarines would play a crucial role in the future and not developing one would mean to be left behind by other navies who were focusing on nuclear submarines.

In addition, the Royal Netherlands Navy was afraid that the diesel-electric s which had just entered service were no match for nuclear submarines. This would be problematic since the Dolfijn-class submarines were the most modern submarines the Dutch navy had at the time in their inventory. Furthermore, it was also a blow to the Dutch navy because their submarine fleet were just getting into the shape the navy had envisioned after the devastating Second World War. Besides Royal Netherlands Navy, Dutch naval experts at the time also stressed in numerous articles how important nuclear submarines were and that there would not be such a big technological leap forward again in at least a decade. These kind of statements and recommendations also encouraged the Royal Netherlands Navy to start thinking about acquiring nuclear submarines. In the meanwhile the keel laying of the two submarines that the Dutch navy had ordered took place on 14 July 1966.  was assigned building number 320, while  was assigned building number 321. The two names were awarded by Queen Juliana of the Netherlands, on 7 September.

The Royal Netherlands Navy, together with research institute TNO, the Reactor Center of the Netherlands and Nevesbu, devoted itself during this time entirely on nuclear propulsion for submarines. However, the construction of Dutch nuclear submarines would never become a reality. There was simply not enough money, since the defence budget in this period could not cover the costs of both constructing nuclear submarines and maintaining all the ships in the Dutch fleet at the same time. Furthermore, already during the negotiations with the United States, it appeared that any nuclear submarines would not be built anytime soon.

The United States was not eager about the idea of the Netherlands building nuclear submarines, they rather had the Dutch navy focus on other areas within the NATO alliance, the negotiations therefore stopped in 1969. Paradoxically NATO did support the Dutch nuclear desire, but added that if the Dutch navy did not succeed in the short term, then two conventional submarines would have to be built.

Design
The Zwaardvis-class submarines were designed by the Royal Netherlands Navy and further worked out by the four biggest Dutch yards at the time, namely RDM, Wilton-Fijenoord, De Schelde and NDSM, and also by Werkspoor N.V. and N.V. Nederlandsche Vereenigde Scheepsbouw Bureaux. In comparison to the three-cylinder design of the Dolfijn-class submarines, the Zwaardvis-class submarines are based on one cylinder. The reasons why the Royal Netherlands Navy and its partners choose for this design was because it resulted in more space within the submarines, which would give the crew a more spacious accommodation and make it also easier to set up machines within the submarines.

In addition, the submarines are based on the U.S. Navy  with the teardrop hull design, which results in the submarines producing less noise. The propulsion of the Zwaardvis class is also different from the Dolfijn-class submarines, for example, it has a single propeller instead of the two propellers the latter has. Furthermore, it has more diesel engines, the batteries require less charging time, it can launch missiles and torpedoes from greater depths, the diving depth has increased substantially, and lastly it can stay longer submerged. The introduction of the Zwaardvis-class submarines also led to the Royal Netherlands Navy using the Mark 37 torpedoes. In 1988 the Mark 37 torpedoes for the Zwaardvis-class submarines were replaced with the newer Mark 48 torpedoes.

Export

In September 1981 the Republic of China (Taiwan) ordered two modified Zwaardvis-class submarines, the Chien Lung/Hai Lung class. In 1992 a repeat order for another four boats was turned down by the Netherlands government because of pressure from the People's Republic of China.

However, the Malaysian Navy declined the offer and chose the French  instead. As a result, the two boats stayed for a long time in Lumut awaiting a buyer and possible refurbishment. In 2005 a Dutch judge ordered on 17 Augustus 2005 that Rotterdamsche Droogdok Maatschappij must start with demolishing the two boats before 1 September 2005, or bring the boats back to the Netherlands before 1 October 2005, else they would have to face penalties, such as a payment penalty. Since Rotterdamsche Droogdok Maatschappij went broke, the Dutch Ministry of Defence eventually paid for the demolishing and scrapping of the two submarines. The costs of this were estimated at €2.8 million and the scrap was sold for €1.4 million.

Boats

See also 
 List of submarine classes in service

Citations

Sources

Books

 Conway's All the World's Fighting Ships 1947–1995

Web sources

 page from Dutch submarines
 
 
 
 

Submarine classes